Caryodaphnopsis cogolloi is a species of plant in the family Lauraceae endemic to Colombia.

References

Lauraceae
Endemic flora of Colombia
Endangered plants
Taxonomy articles created by Polbot